Vladimir Viktorovich Avsyuk (born 15 January 1982) is a former Russian professional football player.

Club career
He played six seasons in the Russian Football National League for FC Metallurg-Kuzbass Novokuznetsk, FC Vityaz Podolsk, and FC Dynamo Saint Petersburg.

References

External links
 

1982 births
Living people
Russian footballers
Association football midfielders
FC Novokuznetsk players
FC Vityaz Podolsk players
FC Dynamo Saint Petersburg players
FC Zenit-2 Saint Petersburg players